Friederike "Fritzi" Schwingl (28 July 1921 – 9 July 2016) was an Austrian slalom and sprint canoeist who competed from the late 1940s to the late 1950s. She won a bronze medal in the K-1 500 m event at the 1948 Summer Olympics in London.

Biography
Schwingl won four medals at the ICF Canoe Sprint World Championships with two silvers (K-1 500 m: 1954, K-2 500 m: 1950) and two bronzes (K-1 500 m: 1950, K-2 500 m: 1948). She also won seven medals at the ICF Canoe Slalom World Championships with three golds (Folding K-1: 1953; Folding K-1 team: 1949, 1951), two silvers (Folding K-1: 1949, 1951) and two bronzes (Folding K-1 team: 1953, 1957). As of 2009, Schwingl is the only woman to medal at both the slalom and sprint canoeing world championships.

References

External links

Amtsblatt Stadt Klosterneuburg, July 2011 - Mention of Fritzi Schwingl's 90th birthday 

1921 births
2016 deaths
Austrian female canoeists
Canoeists at the 1948 Summer Olympics
Olympic canoeists of Austria
Olympic bronze medalists for Austria
Olympic medalists in canoeing
ICF Canoe Sprint World Championships medalists in kayak
Medalists at the 1948 Summer Olympics
Medalists at the ICF Canoe Slalom World Championships